Shooting, for the 2019 Island Games, took place at 4 different venues in Gibraltar in July 2019.

 Clay Shooting Range
 Pistol Shooting Range
 Rifle Shooting Range
 Willis's Magazine

Medal table

Results

ISSF (International Shooting Sport Federation)

Pistol

Rifle

Shotgun

Automatic Ball

NPA (Natural Point of Aim)

IPSC (International Practical Shooting Confederation)

WA (World Association)

References  

2019 Island Games
2019
Island Games